Juran T. Bolden (born June 27, 1974) is a former American cornerback of American and Canadian football. He last played for the Winnipeg Blue Bombers of the Canadian Football League in 2007. He was originally drafted by the Atlanta Falcons in the fourth round (127th overall) of the 1996 NFL Draft. He played high school football for Hillsborough High School in Tampa and collegiately at Mississippi Delta.

Bolden played for Atlanta, the Green Bay Packers, the Carolina Panthers, and then in 1999 he played for the Kansas City Chiefs.  In 2000-2001, he played for the Winnipeg Blue Bombers of the Canadian Football League. He returned to the Atlanta Falcons in 2002, was traded to the only Jacksonville Jaguars in 2004.  He was signed as a free agent by the Tampa Bay Buccaneers in 2005, returning to his hometown.

On April 30, 2007, he was released by the Bucs and returned to the Winnipeg Blue Bombers of the CFL. After missing the last three games of the season as well as the post-season games, Bolden was released before the 2008 training camp on May 27, 2008.

Personal life
Juran is the father of Jackson State University player Isiah Bolden.

References

"Bolden Move", Buccaneer News, March 29, 2005. Accessed January 20, 2006

External links
Juran Bolden profile on NFL.com
Juran Bolden Player Profile on the Buccaneers' website

1974 births
Living people
American football cornerbacks
American players of Canadian football
Atlanta Falcons players
Canadian football defensive backs
Carolina Panthers players
Green Bay Packers players
Jacksonville Jaguars players
Kansas City Chiefs players
Mississippi Delta Trojans football players
Players of Canadian football from Tampa, Florida
Players of American football from Tampa, Florida
Tampa Bay Buccaneers players
Winnipeg Blue Bombers players